Paul Kipkoech (January 6, 1963 – March 16, 1995) was a Kenyan long-distance runner who specialized in the 10,000 metres and cross-country running. He became world champion over 10,000 m in 1987.

Kipkoech was born in Kapsabet.  In 1986 he ran the 3000 metres in 7:39.38 minutes, which was the third best time in the world that season, only behind Saïd Aouita and Sydney Maree.

He retired in 1988 due to illness. He died in 1995 at an Eldoret hospital aged only 32.

International competitions

See also
List of male middle-distance runners
List of World Athletics Championships medalists (men)
List of African Games medalists in athletics (men)
10,000 metres at the World Championships in Athletics
Kenya at the World Athletics Championships

References

http://www.sporting-heroes.net/athletics-heroes/displayhero.asp?HeroID=363

1963 births
1995 deaths
Kenyan male long-distance runners
Kenyan male cross country runners
Olympic male long-distance runners
Olympic athletes of Kenya
Athletes (track and field) at the 1984 Summer Olympics
African Games gold medalists for Kenya
African Games silver medalists for Kenya
African Games medalists in athletics (track and field)
Athletes (track and field) at the 1987 All-Africa Games
World Athletics Championships athletes for Kenya
World Athletics Championships medalists
World Athletics Championships winners
African Cross Country Championships winners
People from Nandi County